James Joseph "Jimmy" Mullins (17 July 1863 – 26 November 1911) was an Australian football player and track racing cyclist. His most emblematic win was in the third annual Austral Wheel Race in 1889.

Australian Football
Mullins, who was a carpenter by trade, ended up playing for five South Australian Football Association clubs: Victorians in 1882, South Park in 1884, Norwood in 1885 and 1886, South Adelaide in 1886 and West Adelaide in 1887.

Cycling
After finishing his football career he became a member of the Norwood Bicycle Club. In his new found sport he proved to be more successful, winning £400 in trophies in four years. The highlight of his career came on 23 November 1889. Riding a penny-farthing bicycle, in front of 15 to 20,000 spectators at the Melbourne Cricket Ground, he won the two-mile Austral Wheel Race. A week later he would add the Australian 10 Mile Championship scratch race to that.

Palmares

1889
1st Austral Wheel Race
1st 10 Miles Championship of Australia

References

Australian male cyclists
1863 births
1911 deaths